George William Ahr (June 23, 1904 – May 5, 1993) was an American prelate of the Catholic Church. He served as bishop of the Diocese of Trenton in New Jersey from 1950 to 1979.

Biography

Early life 
George Ahr was born on June 23, 1904 in Newark, New Jersey.  He attended St. Ann's Grammar School and St. Benedict's Preparatory School, both in Newark. He then studied at St. Vincent College in Latrobe, Pennsylvania and at Seton Hall University in South Orange, New Jersey. 

After completing his theological studies in Rome at the Pontifical North American College, Ahr was ordained to the priesthood for the Archdiocese of Newark on July 29, 1928. He later earned a doctorate in sacred theology in 1929.

Following his return to New Jersey, Ahr first served as a curate at St. Mary's Parish in Jersey City. He then served at St. Venantius Parish in Orange, New Jersey, until 1930, when he became a professor at Seton Hall Preparatory School. Ahr was named professor of dogmatic theology (1933) and later rector (1947) at Immaculate Conception Seminary at Seton Hall

Bishop of Trenton 
On January 28, 1950, Ahr was appointed the seventh bishop of the Diocese of Trenton by Pope Pius XII. He received his episcopal consecration on March 20, 1950, from Archbishop Thomas J. Walsh, with Bishops Bartholomew J. Eustace and Thomas A. Boland serving as co-consecrators. During his tenure, the number of Catholics in the diocese rose from 300,000 to 850,000.  Ahr founded 50 parishes and dedicated 100 new churches, 90 schools, and over 60 other buildings. He attended the Second Vatican Council in Rome from 1962 to 1965. Ahr perceived a growing anti-clericalism in the United States, and opposed the Christian Layman's Experimental Organization.

Retirement and legacy 
On June 23, 1979, Pope John Paul II accepted Ahr's resignation as bishop of the Diocese of Trenton; he was the longest-serving bishop of Trenton. George Ahr died at Morris Hall Home of the Aged in Lawrenceville, New Jersey, on May 5, 1993, at age 88.

References

1904 births
1993 deaths
Saint Vincent College alumni
Seton Hall University alumni
Clergy from Newark, New Jersey
Participants in the Second Vatican Council
20th-century Roman Catholic bishops in the United States
Roman Catholic bishops of Trenton